Chrislam is a portmanteau of Islam and Christianity as a fictional religion that was originally coined by G.K. Chesterton in The Flying Inn while he was still an Anglican. It may also refer to:

 Chrislam, a fictional religion in Arthur C. Clarke's 1993 novel The Hammer of God

 Nigerian Chrislam, a blend of Islam and Christianity among the Yoruba of Nigeria

 The Nation of Islam led by Elijah Muhammad had been considered to teach Chrislam.

 Christlam, a movement created by Eldridge Cleaver which combined Evangelicalism and Islam.

 Muhammadan Christianity, synthesized by some Socinians and Unitarians such as Henry Stubbe.

See also
 Catholic Commission for Religious Relations with Muslims

References